Coorparoo railway station is located on the Cleveland line in Queensland, Australia. It serves the Brisbane suburb of Coorparoo.

On 15 July 1996, the Fisherman Islands line to the Port of Brisbane opened to the north of the station.

Services
Coorparoo is served by Cleveland line services from Shorncliffe, Northgate, Doomben and Bowen Hills to Cannon Hill, Manly and Cleveland.

Services by platform

References

External links

Coorparoo station Queensland Rail
Coorparoo station Queensland's Railways on the Internet
[ Coorparoo station] TransLink travel information

Railway stations in Brisbane
Coorparoo, Queensland